Walter van Hauwe (born 16 November 1948) is a Dutch recorder player.

Biography and career
After lessons at the music school of Delft, where his father was director Pierre van Hauwe, Hauwe studied recorder with Frans Brüggen at the Royal Conservatory of The Hague.  Working with Kees Boeke he developed a controversial education system called the BLOK (block) system.
  
He has been a professor of recorder at the Sweelinck Conservatory since 1971, and also teaches historical performance at the Royal College of Music in London. 

In 2002 he received the Dutch Prins Bernard Music Award.

Hauwe has performed or worked with Quadro Hotteterre, Little Consort, Sour Cream, Maarten Altena Ensemble and marimba player Keiko Abe. He has recorded for Telefunken, Vanguard, Columbia-Denon, RCA, CBS, Attacca and  Channel Classics/Moeck.

He is the author of The Modern Recorder Player (3 volumes), published by Schott, translated in several languages.

References

Further reading
 

1948 births
Living people
Dutch recorder players
People from Delft
Dutch performers of early music